Mark Knowles and Daniel Nestor were the defending champions but lost in the quarterfinals to Rainer Schüttler and Mikhail Youzhny.

Donald Johnson and Jared Palmer won in the final 6–3, 7–6(7–5) against Jiří Novák and David Rikl.

Seeds

  Donald Johnson /  Jared Palmer (champions)
  Jiří Novák /  David Rikl (final)
  Mark Knowles /  Daniel Nestor (quarterfinals)
  Petr Pála /  Pavel Vízner (quarterfinals)

Draw

External links
 2002 Qatar Open Doubles Draw

2002 Qatar Open
Doubles
Qatar Open (tennis)